These shows are scheduled to premiere in 2013. The premiere dates may be changed depending on a variety of factors.

See also
 2013 in the United States
 List of American films of 2013

References

 
2013-related lists
Mass media timelines by year